The Crown Commonwealth League of Rights was an umbrella organisation founded in 1972 by Eric Butler for the various League of Rights organisations and to achieve membership of the World Anti-Communist League. Those organisations were:

Australian League of Rights
British League of Rights
Canadian League of Rights
New Zealand League of Rights

Anti-communist organizations
International political organizations
Organizations established in 1972
Commonwealth of Nations